Spotted seahorse may refer to:

 Hippocampus kuda, a species of seahorse, native to the Indian and Pacific oceans
 Hippocampus erectus or Lined seahorse, a species of seahorse, native to the Atlantic Ocean